Papineau is a regional county municipality in the Outaouais region of Quebec, Canada. The seat is Papineauville.

Subdivisions
There are 24 subdivisions within the RCM:

Demographics

Mother tongue from Canada 2016 Census

In 2016, the population of Papineau was 22,832 inhabitants.  The population of Papineau is roughly 93% francophone and 5% anglophone.

Transportation

Access Routes
Highways and numbered routes that run through the municipality, including external routes that start or finish at the county border:

 Autoroutes
 

 Principal Highways
 

 Secondary Highways
 
 
 
 
 
 

 External Routes
 None

See also
 List of regional county municipalities and equivalent territories in Quebec

References

External links

 Regional municipality website

Regional county municipalities in Outaouais
Census divisions of Quebec